Stephen of Bohemia was a Franciscan friar and a member of the Papal mission to the Mongol Empire in 1245–1247.

Stephen set out from Lyon with John of Pian del Carpine on 16 April 1245. They travelled through Bohemia to the territory of Duke Bolesław II of Silesia, where they were joined by Benedict of Poland at Wrocław. A certain Ceslaus, also from Bohemia, is mentioned once in the Tartar Relation, but this may be the same person as Stephen. Stephen fell ill not far beyond Kiev. As a consequence, he was left behind in Mongol-occupied Cumania, possibly as a hostage. Ill health prevented him from ever going further. He did not visit the court of Batu, khan of the Golden Horde, or that of the Great Khan Güyük.

Stephen seems to have been picked up by the mission on its return. He was used as a source by the author of the Tartar Relation.

Notes

Bibliography

13th-century Bohemian people
Franciscan missionaries